A by-election for the seat of Canterbury in the New South Wales Legislative Assembly was held on 4 February 1860 because of the resignation of Edward Flood.

Dates

Results

Edward Flood resigned.

See also
Electoral results for the district of Canterbury
List of New South Wales state by-elections

References

1860 elections in Australia
New South Wales state by-elections
1860s in New South Wales